Kyle Andrews is an American indie rock songwriter and performer born in Chicago and based in Nashville, Tennessee.

Career 
Andrews has released albums on Portland's Badman Recording Co. as well as his own Elephant Lady Records imprint. His 2010 song "You Always Make Me Smile" (co-written with friend Neil Mason) was featured in a worldwide Holiday Inn ad. The music video for the song was filmed in Utah during an attempt to break the Guinness World Record for the largest water balloon fight and went viral.

His interactive video for "Sushi" (directed by Dennis Liu) was made from 1.4 million tiles, and thousands of unique YouTube video stills. In 2010 it was shortlisted for the Guggenheim's YouTube Play Exhibit.

His music has been used in other TV shows and commercials, including a worldwide television ad for Dell ("We Were Colors") and a national television ad for Doritos ("Bombs Away"). "You Always Make Me Smile" also appeared in an episode of ABC's Grey's Anatomy.

Although Kyle performs as a first-name/last-name artist, and self-recorded the majority of his discography, he plays live with a full band.

Andrews' fifth album, Robot Learn Love, was released August 16, 2011.

Discography 

2006 – Amos In Ohio
2007 – Find Love, Let Go
2008 – Real Blasty
2010 – Kangaroo EP
2010 – Bombs Away / We Were Colors (digital-only single)
2011 – Robot Learn Love
2013 – Brighter Than The Sun
2016 – Escape
2018 – Big Hearts Exploding

References

External links
Official Site
Kyle Andrews on Bandcamp
[ AMG Allmusic page]

1982 births
Songwriters from Illinois
Living people
Singers from Chicago
21st-century American male singers
21st-century American singers
American male songwriters